Himmatsinhji (or Himatsinhji) is a Gujarati personal name often used by the Rajputs, which includes the suffixes -sinh and -ji. Another variant is Himmat Singh. People with the name include:
 Himmat Singh (1899–1960), last ruler of the princely state of Idar State
 Himmatsinhji (general) (1897–1973), Indian general, politician, and sportsman, first Lieutenant-Governor of Himachal Pradesh
 Himmatsinhji M. K. (1928–2008), Indian politician and ornithologist, son of the Maharao Saheb of Kutch
 Himmat Singh (Sikhism) (1661–1705), one of the Five Beloved in Sikhism
 Himmat Singh (cricketer) (born 1996), Indian cricketer